Santa Teresa Formation may refer to:
 Santa Teresa Formation, Colombia, a Late Oligocene geologic formation of the Middle Magdalena Valley, Colombia
 Santa Teresa Formation, Costa Rica, an Early Miocene geologic formation of Costa Rica
 Santa Teresa Formation, Cuba, an Aptian to Cenomanian geologic formation of Cuba